Juan Martín Amieva (born 27 September 1988) was an Argentine footballer.

He played for Mushuc Runa.

References
 Profile at BDFA 
 

1988 births
Living people
Argentine footballers
Argentine expatriate footballers
K.S.C. Lokeren Oost-Vlaanderen players
Defensores de Belgrano footballers
C.D. Antofagasta footballers
Expatriate footballers in Chile
Expatriate footballers in Belgium
Association football forwards
People from San Luis, Argentina